Spirit is the second studio album by English singer and actor Sean Maguire. It was released on 3 June 1996 by Parlophone Records.

Background
Maguire spent most of 1995 and the beginning of 1996 recording the album while simultaneously juggling his acting career in Dangerfield.

Singles
Four singles were released from the album: "Now I've Found You", "You To Me Are Everything", "Good Day", and "Don't Pull Your Love".

Commercial performance
Spirit peaked at number forty-three on the UK Albums Chart.

Critical reception

Spirit received generally mixed reviews from music critics.

Track listing

Chart positions

References

1996 albums
Sean Maguire albums